The United States ambassador to Rwanda is the official representative of the president of the United States to the head of state of Rwanda.

Until 1962 Rwanda had been a part of the United Nations Trust Territory of Ruanda-Urundi under the trusteeship of Belgium. In June 1962 the UN General Assembly terminated the Belgian trusteeship and granted full independence to Rwanda and Burundi. The United States immediately recognized the Rwandan government on its independence day, July 1, 1962, and moved to establish diplomatic relations. The U.S. Embassy in the capital Kigali was established on July 1, 1962, with David J.S. Manbey as Chargé d'Affaires ad interim. Charles D. Withers was appointed as Ambassador Extraordinary and Plenipotentiary to Rwanda on March 9, 1963.

Ambassadors and chiefs of mission

Notes

See also
Rwanda – United States relations
Foreign relations of Rwanda
Ambassadors of the United States

References
United States Department of State: Background notes on Rwanda

External links
 United States Department of State: Chiefs of Mission for Rwanda
 United States Department of State: Rwanda
 United States Embassy in Kigali
 

Rwanda
United States
Main